Launis is a surname. Notable people with the surname include:

Armas Launis (1884–1959), Finnish composer
Ilmari Launis (1881–1955), Finnish architect
Mika Launis (born 1949), Finnish illustrator and graphic designer

See also
Launi
Lauris (given name)